Ivan Michael Antunovic is a New Zealand criminal defence lawyer.

High-profile cases

Olivia Hope and Ben Smart murder
Along with Greg King, Antunovic was co-defence counsel for Scott Watson, who was charged with the double murder of Ben Smart and Olivia Hope. Watson was found guilty of the murders. On appeal, Antunovic and King failed to convince the Privy Council to overturn the conviction.

Death of Janet Moses by family members using exorcism
In 2007, 22-year-old Janet Moses died after members of her family poured water into her eyes and down her throat at a Wainuiomata flat. Antunovic, acting for the defence, argued (unsuccessfully) that instead of trying to commit a criminal offence, the defendants were in reality trying to help Moses. Five members of Moses' family were convicted of manslaughter.

References

21st-century New Zealand lawyers